The 2012–13 Brisbane Roar season was their eighth season in the A-League. As runner up in 2011–12, Brisbane were looking to continue their run of good form in the League, aiming to win their second Premiership. The Roar were also looking to replicate their Championship success which saw them become the first A-League team to win back-to-back Championships. To replicate their 2011–12 success, they would have to make history by making it to the Grand Final, as no team has ever qualified for three consecutive Grand Finals.

As a result of winning the 2012 A-League Grand Final, the Roar competed in the 2013 AFC Champions League for the second time in their history. The Roar were looking to improve on a disappointing debut 2012 ACL campaign, which saw them pick up three points, finishing equal bottom of their group. Following the departure of manager Ange Postecoglou to Melbourne Victory, Rado Vidošić, who had been the clubs' assistant coach for the past seven years, took over as manager for his first full season in charge. After 11 games at the helm, Rado Vidošić was elevated to the Technical Director's role with the club, with former Gold Coast United coach Mike Mulvey taking over as head coach.

Squad lineup for 2012/13
Correct as of 30 August 2012 – players numbers as per the official Brisbane Roar website

Successful Trialists
  Do Dong-Hyun
  Kwame Yeboah

Unsuccessful Trialists
  Bae Hae-Min

Transfers and Contracts

New Contracts

In

Out

Pre-Season and friendlies

Competitions

Overall

A-League

Having been the first signing for former coach Ange Postecoglou, Olyroo international Andrew Redmayne signed a contract with Melbourne Heart on 21 January 2012. Having featured on just 2 occasions for the first team, Redmayne would officially join the Heart on 31 May 2012, citing he needed to play first team football. The Roar would welcome two South Koreans to the club on trial to see if they could potentially be a signing for the club. With one spot left on the visa list with the departure of Canadian Issey Nakajima-Farran, only one could be signed. However, with the trial having finished, neither player was signed and inevitably, both players left the club. With his future in the air and several clubs interested in his services, former Gold Coast United player Ben Halloran would eventually sign with the Roar on a three-year contract on 13 May 2012, with ex Roar coach Postecoglou missing out on his signature. On 15 June, Brisbane Roar W-League coach Jeff Hopkins would be announced as Rado Vidošićs right-hand man for the coming season, with his tactical knowledge and analytical skills being described as excellent and beneficial for everyone at the club. Just 4 days later, The 2012–13 A-League season would be drawn, with a rematch of the previous seasons Grand Final taking place in Perth, with the game taking place at Paterson Stadium. This will see the first time football (soccer) has been played at the stadium since the 2003-04 National Soccer League Preliminary Final which saw the Glory defeat Adelaide United 5–0.

On 9 July 2012, Bahraini central defender Sayed Mohamed Adnan would knock back a contract offer to remain at the Roar, citing the need for him and his family to move back to the Middle East. The leaving of the lanky defender would free up a second Visa spot for the club for the coming season. With this news circulating, the Roar have been rumoured to have a high intention of filling the now open visa position with another foreign defender. Just a day later, the defensive unit at the Roar would get a reprieve with the promotion of Youth League goalkeeper Matt Acton on a 2-year contract. The promotion would see a second goalkeeper join the first team since the departure of Andrew Redmayne. On 17 July 2012, one of the South Koreaans who trialled with the club back in May, Do Dong-Hyun, signed a 3-year contract with the Roar, taking one of the two visa spots left open by the departures of Issey Nakajima-Farran and Sayed Mohamed Adnan. The 19-year-old left winger brings the number of players in the squad to 20. Exactly a week later, the Roar would open their pre-season account against Brisbane Olympic at Goodwin Park in Yeronga. The Roar would turn on the style, easing to victory in a 5–0 romp over the Brisbane Premier League side. A George Lambadaridis header via a cross from new signing Do Dong-Hyun would take the Roar to a 1–0 lead at half time, before a hat-trick by Besart Berisha and an Own Goal by an Olympic defender would seal the win in the second half.

On 1 August 2012, Michael Theoklitos would change his surname via deed poll to Michael Theo. Theo would claim that "Around the football traps, I’ve always been known as Michael Theo so I just thought, why not make it official?" Just 4 days later, youngster Kofi Danning would sign with fellow Bakrie Group owned team, Belgian side C.S. Visé on a two-year contract with the option of a third year. On 14 January 2013, Brisbane Roar were knocked out of the 2013 AFC Champions League losing 3–0 on penalties to Buriram United after a scoreless draw. This made them the first ever A-League side to fail to make the group stages of the tournament after getting a Play-off Spot.

League table

Matches

A-League Finals series

2013 Asian Champions League
Brisbane initially qualified for the 2013 AFC Champions League as a result of winning the 2012 A-League Grand Final, qualifying for the Group stage. However, on 29 November 2012, the Asian Football Confederation cut Australia's initial 2 direct group stage slots and 1 play-off slot to just 1 direct group stage and 1 play-off slot for the Asian Champions League. As a result of that, the Roar's direct group stage was removed, leaving the two time A-League champions with a play-off spot. Since the Central Coast Mariners won the premier's plate as a result of finishing first in the regular season, the Mariners would take the direct group stage slot.

Despite earning the right to host the match courtesy of Australia's higher points ranking during the Asian Football Confederation’s evaluation process, Brisbane was forced to seek a change of match day for the fixture. With Suncorp Stadium unavailable on the matchday designated by the AFC and a Hyundai A-League match scheduled the next day, Brisbane sought to have the matchday officially changed by the AFC. The club were told in response the calendar had been finalised and could not be altered.

Play-off

Statistics

Squad statistics

Statistics accurate as of 12 April 201390 Minutes played is counted as a full game. Injury Time is not counted. A sub's appearance is counted up to the 90th minute as well. If a substitution is made during extra time, it is counted as a full game (90mins) to the player that started. The substitute is credited with the number of minutes made up from 30 seconds for every substitution in the game by both teams combined. If there is an uneven number of substitutions made in total, the number of minutes is rounded up to the following number (2.5 mins = 3 mins).
A-League Games played: 27ACL Games played: 1Finals series Games played: 2

  Player has departed the club mid season
  Player has joined the club mid season

 [1] – Yuji Takahashi replaced Jack Hingert in the 90th minute vs Wellington Phoenix (Rnd 3). 5 substitutions were made in total
 [2] – Yuji Takahashi replaced Jack Hingert in the 90th minute vs Newcastle Jets (Rnd 9). 6 substitutions were made in total
 [3] – Massimo Murdocca replaced Besart Berisha in the 90th minute vs Adelaide United (Rnd 12). 5 substitutions were made in total
 [4] – Julius Doe replaced Mitch Nichols in the 90th minute vs Perth Glory (Rnd 18). 6 substitutions were made in total
 [5] – The 2013 AFC Champions League qualifying play-off game between Buriram United and Brisbane Roar went to Extra Time, equating to 120 minutes (90min + 2x15min halves)
 [6] – Ben Halloran replaced Jack Hingert in the 90th minute vs Melbourne Heart (Round 26). 5 substitutions were made in total

Disciplinary Record
Correct as of 12 April 2013 (End of Season)

[1] Thomas Broich had his straight red card rescinded from the Rnd 9 game vs Newcastle Jets on Saturday, 1 December 2012
[2] James Donachie received 2 yellow cards resulting in a red card from the Rnd 14 game vs Wellington Phoenix on Tuesday, 1 January 2013
[3] Shane Stefanutto & Besart Berisha both received their 5th yellow cards of the season resulting in a 1-game suspension per FFA rules, from the Rnd 17 game vs Western Sydney Wanderers on Sunday, 20 January 2013
[4] Matt Jurman received his 5th yellow card of the season resulting in a 1-game suspension per FFA rules, from the Rnd 19 game vs Central Coast Mariners on Friday, 1 February 2013

League Goalscorers by round

  A goal was scored from a penalty kick
  Two goals were scored from penalty kicks
  Players were not selected in matchday squad or used as a substitute for highlighted round i.e. did not make an appearance

Home Attendance

League attendance and average includes Finals series

See also
 Brisbane Roar FC records and statistics
 List of Brisbane Roar FC players
 Brisbane Roar end of season awards
 2013 AFC Champions League
 Brisbane Roar website 
 A-League website

References

Brisbane Roar FC seasons
2012–13 A-League season by team